Gifford High School is a government-owned boys-only high school in Bulawayo, Zimbabwe. The school was founded in 1927 as the Bulawayo Technical School led by Mr Philip Henry Gifford and four teachers, with an enrolment of 39 pupils.

Timeline 
1927 - Bulawayo Technical School Established, Philip Henry Gifford appointed Headmaster
1929 - The new School building was opened
1931 - High School status achieved, Founder of the Old Technicians’ Association 
1933 - Beit Hall was presented by the Trust
1947 - Henry John Sutherby appointed Headmaster
1953 - Andrew Hart appointed Headmaster, Move to Matopos Road opposite to the Zimbabwe International Trade Fair (ZITF) Showgrounds
1961 - Donald Robert White appointed Headmaster, The Bulawayo Technical School becomes Gifford Technical High School (GTHS)
1962 - Philip Henry Gifford dies, 
1967 - Ivor John McLachlan appointed Headmaster
1974 - Harry Fincham appointed Headmaster, McLachlan Pool named in honour of Headmaster Ivor John McLachlan
1974 - School renamed Gifford High School as a result of its change to a comprehensive high school offering the same range of subjects as other high schools.
1976 - Old South Field renamed the Sutherby Field in honour of Headmaster Henry John Sutherby.  Andrew Hart Field named in honour of Headmaster Andrew Hart
1977 - Jubilee celebrations (50th Anniversary)
1983 - Anthony Menne appointed Headmaster
2003 - Siziba appointed Headmaster
2006 - Moyo appointed Headmaster
2009 - J.T. Nzima appointed Headmaster

Emblems 
The School's colours are maroon and silver, and the motto is Hinc Orior meaning “from here I arise”, or, more freely, “from these beginnings my formed mind springs.” These colours were registered in 1957.

School Development Association (SDA) 
The school is administered by the Gifford High School Development Association in terms of Statutory instrument 379 of 1998 – Education (School Development Associations) Government Schools) Regulations [Zimbabwe]

The SDA is composed of parents or legal guardians of pupils enrolled at school and Teachers employed by the school.  The affairs of school are administered by an Executive Committee of the SDA which has a minimum of 7 and maximum of 11 members, with a duration of office 1 year (renewable).  Office bearers are elected at an AGM by April of each year.  SDA meetings are convened by the Executive Committee or at least one third of the members of the SDA.  Voting decisions at SDA meetings are by majority or secret ballot if ten (10) or more members request this.  Fiscal year is calendar year ending 31 December.

Headmasters

Sports 
Athletics
Basketball
Cricket
Rugby
Soccer
Tennis
Volleyball

Alumni 
Gifford High School alumni are referred to as "Old Technicians", the name being derived from the original Bulawayo Technical School name.
 
Notable alumni include:

Brian Davison, cricketer
John Love, racing driver
Gary Hocking, motorcycle racing rider 
Oscar Bonginkosi Mdlongwa,"Oskido" musician
Ronald (Ronnie) Hill, Springbok Rugby player

References

External links 
 Gifford Technical High School Old Boy's Contact List

Buildings and structures in Bulawayo
High schools in Zimbabwe
Boys' schools in Zimbabwe
Boys' high schools in Zimbabwe
Educational institutions established in 1927
Education in Bulawayo
1927 establishments in Southern Rhodesia